Paphinia subclausa is a species of orchid endemic to Costa Rica.

Taxonomy 
The classification of this orchid species was published by Robert Louis Dressler in Novon; a Journal for Botanical Nomenclature, 7: 121, fig. 1997 - St. Louis, MO, United States. The species was collected in Reserva Juan Castro Blanco by D.E.Mora-Retana, 900 m, Costa Rica (Central America, Southern America). The holotype is kept at USJ (USJ = Universidad de San José?).

References 

subclausa
Endemic orchids of Costa Rica